During the 1950s the Missouri Tigers baseball team were playing in the Big Eight Conference (before 1958 the "Big Seven Conference"). They finished the season as champions in 1952 and 1958, and both times were runners-up in the College World Series.

1950

The 1950 Missouri Tigers baseball team represented the University of Missouri in the 1950 NCAA baseball season. The Tigers played their home games at Rollins Field. The team was coached by Hi Simmons in his 12th season at Missouri.

Roster

Schedule

1951

The 1951 Missouri Tigers baseball team represented the University of Missouri in the 1951 NCAA baseball season. The Tigers played their home games at Rollins Field. The team was coached by Hi Simmons in his 13th season at Missouri.

Roster

Schedule

1952

1953

The 1953 Missouri Tigers baseball team represented the University of Missouri in the 1953 NCAA baseball season. The Tigers played their home games at Rollins Field. The team was coached by Hi Simmons in his 15th season at Missouri.

Roster

Schedule

1954

1955

The 1955 Missouri Tigers baseball team represented the University of Missouri in the 1955 NCAA baseball season. The Tigers played their home games at Rollins Field. The team was coached by Hi Simmons in his 17th season at Missouri.

Roster

Schedule

1956

The 1956 Missouri Tigers baseball team represented the University of Missouri in the 1956 NCAA baseball season. The Tigers played their home games at Rollins Field. The team was coached by Hi Simmons in his 18th season at Missouri.

Roster

Schedule

1957

The 1957 Missouri Tigers baseball team represented the University of Missouri in the 1957 NCAA University Division baseball season. The Tigers played their home games at Rollins Field. The team was coached by Hi Simmons in his 19th season at Missouri.

Roster

Schedule

1958

1959

References

Missouri Tigers baseball seasons